Pegah Ahangarani (born 24 July 1984) is an Iranian actress and  director. She has received various accolades, including a Crystal Simorgh, a Hafez Award and an Iran's Film Critics and Writers Association Award.

Filmography
 The Singing Cat (1990 – Directed by Kambuzia Partovi)
 The Girl in the Sneakers (1999 – Directed by Rasul Sadr Ameli)
 Women's Prison (2002 – Directed by Manijeh Hekmat)
 Our Days (2002 – Directed by Rakhshan Bani-Etemad)
 Maxx (2005 – Directed by Saman Moghadam)
 Sweet Jam (2006 – Directed by Arezoo Petrossian)
 Three Women (2008 – Directed by Manijeh Hekmat)
 Shirin (2008 – Directed by Abbas Kiarostami)
 Maritime silk road (2010 – Directed by Mohammad Bozorgnia)
 No Men Allowed (2011 – Directed by Rambod Javan)
 Trapped (2013 – Directed by Parviz Shahbazi)
 Atom Heart Mother (2013 – Directed by Ali Ahmadzadeh)
 A Persian Melody (2015 - Directed by Hamid Reza Ghotbi)
 Bandar Band (2020)

Awards and nominations 
 Best Actress Award, for The Girl in Sneakers, 23rd Cairo International Film Festival, Egypt, December 1999
 Best Performance Award, for The Girl in Sneakers, Dokhtari ba Kafshhaye Katani (original title), 14th Isfahan International Film and Video Festival for Children and Young Adults, Iran, October 1999
 Best Actress Award, for Women’s Prison, "Zendan-e zanan" (original title),  a movie that is directed by her mother wherein Pegah played three different roles, Locarno Film Festival 
 Best Supporting Actress for Trapped, 31st International Fajr Film Festival 2013

Arrests 
Ahangarani was arrested on 27 July 2009 in the wake of the turmoil after the 2009 presidential election, allegedly for her work in support of opposition candidate Mir-Hossein Mousavi. She was later released but arrested again on 10 July 2011 prior to her planned trip to Germany to report on the 2011 FIFA Women's World Cup for the Persian service of the German broadcaster Deutsche Welle. She was released from Evin Prison two weeks later on the equivalent of $84,000 bail after expressions of "outrage among foreign governments and human rights organizations".

References

External links 

Pegah Ahangarani at Namnakh
 A review of The Girl in the Sneakers
 Farhangsara Awards
 Mini-biography in Persian

1984 births
Living people
People from Arak, Iran
Iranian film actresses
Iranian stage actresses
Iranian child actresses
Iranian women film directors
Iranian documentary filmmakers
Crystal Simorgh for Best Supporting Actress winners